Pacific Northwest Ballet (PNB) is a ballet company based in Seattle, Washington, in the United States. It is said to have the highest per capita attendance in the United States, with 11,000 subscribers in 2004. The company consists of 49 dancers; there are more than 100 performances throughout the year.

PNB performs in McCaw Hall at the Seattle Center. It is especially known for its performance of the Stowell/Maurice Sendak Nutcracker, which it had presented from 1983 through 2014, as well as made into a feature film. In 2006, the company was chosen to perform in the Fall for Dance Festival at New York's City Center Theatre and at the Jacob's Pillow Dance Festival.

History 
Pacific Northwest Ballet was founded in 1972, after the two-month residency of First Chamber Dance Company, as part of the Seattle Opera and named the Pacific Northwest Dance Association. Under the directorship of Kent Stowell and Francia Russell, originally of New York City Ballet, it broke away from the Opera in 1977 and took its current name in 1978. Stowell and Russell left at the end of the 2004–2005 season. A portrait by artist Michele Rushworth was painted of Stowell and Russell and installed in the Phelps Center, Seattle, to commemorate their careers and retirement. Both had studied with and danced for George Balanchine.

In July 2005, Peter Boal succeeded Stowell and Russell as artistic director following their retirement. After dancing with the New York City Ballet for 22 years, he had been a full-time faculty member at The School of American Ballet from 1995-2005.

In 2013, the company and its orchestra toured to New York for the first time in sixteen years. The New York Times dance critic Alastair Macaulay, stated of their presentation that "This is a true company," more "unified in its understanding of Balanchine" than the New York City Ballet.

In 2012, PNB brought in Twyla Tharp as its first artist in residence for a year-long residency.

Pacific Northwest Ballet School 
The Pacific Northwest Ballet School was founded in 1974. Formerly directed by Francia Russell, and now directed by Peter Boal, it has been considered to be "one of the leading, if not the definitive, professional training school in the country." The teaching is structured on that of the School of American Ballet. Pacific Northwest Ballet holds an annual summer course in the month of July and is considered one of the leading summer dance education facilities in the country.

Dancers 
Pacific Northwest Ballet is noted for choosing dancers that have physique, expressivity and a variety of body shapes.

Principals 

 Jonathan Batista
 Leta Biasucci
 Kyle Davis
 Angelica Generosa
 Cecilia Iliesiu
 Elle Macy
 James Yoichi Moore
 Elizabeth Murphy
 Lucien Postlewaite
 Lesley Rausch
 James Kirby Rogers
 Dylan Wald

Soloists 

 Madison Rayn Abeo
 Dammiel Cruz-Garrido
 Christopher D'Ariano
 Amanda Morgan
 Miles Pertl
 Christian Poppe
 Sarah-Gabrielle Ryan
 Price Suddarth
 Leah Terada
 Ezra Thomson

Corps de ballet 

 

 Malena Ani
 Ryan Cardea
 Mark Cuddihee
 Abby Jayne DeAngelo
 Luther DeMyer
 Ashton Edwards
 Melisa Guilliams
 Connor Horton
 Zsilas Michael Hughes
 Clara Ruf Maldonado
 Audrey Malek
 Noah Martzall 
 Joh Morrill
 Ginabel Peterson 
 Juliet Prine
 Kuu Sakuragi
 Yuki Takahashi
 Genevieve Waldorf
 Lily Wills

Notable former dancers 

 Patricia Barker
 Chalnessa Eames
 Carrie Imler
 Carla Körbes
 Louise Nadeau
 Kaori Nakamura
 Noelani Pantastico
 Miranda Weese

References

Reviews 

 NY Times by Alastair Macaulay, November 5, 2007
 NY Times by Alastair Macaulay, September 25, 2007

External links 
 
 Pacific Northwest Ballet at HistoryLink

Culture of Seattle
Ballet companies in the United States
Ballet schools in the United States
1972 establishments in Washington (state)
Performing groups established in 1972
Dance in Washington (state)
Non-profit organizations based in Washington (state)
Organizations based in Seattle